Trimurtulu is a 1987 Indian Telugu-language masala film, produced by T. Subbarami Reddy and directed by K. Murali Mohana Rao. The film stars Venkatesh, Arjun, Rajendra Prasad, Shobana, Khushbu and Aswini, with music composed by Bappi Lahiri. It is a remake of the Hindi film Naseeb (1981). The film was released on 24 June 1987, and performed average at the box office.

Plot 
Ram Murthy a hotel server; Damodaram a photographer; Kotaiah, a chariot rider and Bhadrayah, a bandmaster are four friends. They buy a lottery ticket from a drunkard. The ticket turns out to be a winner when Damodaram & Kotaiah ploys by slaughtering Bhadrayah and indicting Ram Murthy and even tries to stamp out him too. As a result, his two children, Raja & Sandeep are lifted alone when their aunt Mary rears them along with her daughter Julie. Years roll by, Damodaram & Kotaiah turns as multi-millionaires with lottery amount and contract a fabulous hotel. Accompanying, Raja as a waiter and Damodaram sends his son Siva to abroad for schooling. Here Raja & Siva are bosom friends from childhood and coincidentally, they love the same girl Latha, Bhadrayah's daughter. Eventually, Julie falls for Siva. Meanwhile, Siva returns as an alcoholic & ailing due to Latha's refusal. Discovering it, Raja sacrifices his love by developing hatred towards him. Simultaneously, Sandeep is the beau of Rani, Latha's younger sister. Learning it, their mother Malathi rejects the match, perceiving him as Ram Murthy's son.

Right now, as a flabbergast, Ram Murthy is alive in Hong Kong, rescued by a person Don a gangster. Presently, the wheel of fortune makes Damodaram & Kotaiah as Don's partners who misled him in a deal. So, Don sends Ram Murthy in his place to take avenge. However, Kotaiah identifies him and wants to eliminate both Ram Murthy & Damodaram too. At that juncture, Siva finds out Raja's sacrifice, so he returns his love back and decides to marry Julie. Thereupon, Kotaiah's son Ashok attacks Damodaram but he escapes. In that combat, Ram Murthy kidnaps Siva & Ashok and Raja chases them, where he recognises him as his father when Siva also joins them. Besides, enraged Damodaram brings out the proof of photograph while Kotaiah slaying out Bhadrayah. Being aware of it, Kotaiah kills Damodaram, fortunately, by the time, Sandeep arrives, and before dying, Damodaram hands over it to him. Currently, Kotaiah mortgages with Ram Murthy for Ashok instead of Sandeep. During that time, all at once, Don strikes on them, seizes the proof. At last, the trio ceases the baddies and saves Ram Murthy. Finally, the movie ends on a happy note with the marriage of the trio with their fiancées, and again, the same drunkard visits their new hotel to sell a lottery ticket.

Cast 

 Venkatesh as Raja
 Arjun as Siva
 Rajendra Prasad as Sandeep
 Shobana as Latha
 Khushbu as Julie
 Aswini as Rani
 Rao Gopal Rao as Damodaram
 Satyanarayana as Ram Murthy
 Allu Ramalingaiah as Drunkard
 Nutan Prasad as Kotaiah
 Anupam Kher as Don
 Sudhakar as Ashok
 Bob Christo as Fighter
 Balaji as Kotaiah's younger son
 Ramji as John
 Thyagaraju as Agent KK
 Bhimeswara Rao as Bhadraiah
 Suthi Veerabhadra Rao as Principal
 Suthivelu as Achary
 Peketi Sivaram as Ad Film Director
 Mada as Ad Film Director
 Nagesh as Ad Film Hero
 Chitti Babu as Robin
 K. K. Sarma as Masthan
 Dham as Hotel Server
 Sumitra as Mary
 Anitha as Malathi
 K. Vijaya as Shanti
 Mamatha as Lecturer
 Master Satish as Young Raja
 Master Suresh as Young Siva
 Baby Seeta as Young Julie

Special appearances

 Krishna
 Sobhan Babu
 Krishnam Raju
 Chiranjeevi
 Nandamuri Balakrishna
 Nagarjuna
 Chandra Mohan
 Murali Mohan
 Paruchuri Brothers
 Gollapudi Maruti Rao
 Padmanabham
 A. Kodandarami Reddy
 Kodi Rama Krishna
 Vijaya Nirmala
 Sharada
 Raadhika
 Vijayashanti
 Radha
 Bhanupriya
 Jayamalini
 Anuradha
 Y. Vijaya

Soundtrack 
Music was composed by Bappi Lahiri, and released via Lahari Music.

References

External links 
 

1980s masala films
1980s Telugu-language films
1987 films
Films scored by Bappi Lahiri
Telugu remakes of Hindi films